"Kiss One More Time" is a song by Tomoko Kawase, released as her second single under Tommy February6, on November 21, 2001. The song peaked at number 20 in Japan and stayed on the charts for 10 weeks.

This song was also covered by indie electro-rock duo "Midnight Brown".

Track listing
 Kiss One More Time
 Tommy Feb Latte, Macaron. (トミーフェブラッテ、マカロン。)
 Candy Pop in Love
 Kiss One More Time (Sunaga't Experience's Euro/Set Remix)

References

Songs about kissing
2001 singles
2001 songs
Tomoko Kawase songs